Arthur Vincent (Pete) Peterson (October 31, 1912 – March 24, 2008) was a United States Army colonel who served as the Manhattan District's Chicago Area Engineer. In this capacity he was responsible for the Metallurgical Laboratory, which developed the first nuclear reactors. Plutonium bred in these reactors was used in the Fat Man atomic bomb that was dropped on Nagasaki. He traveled to Europe before D-Day to warn General  Dwight D. Eisenhower about the dangers of the Germans using radioactive weapons.

After the war he was the  chief of its Fissionable Materials Branch of the Atomic Energy Commission (AEC) from 1947 to 1953, when he left to become general manager of the new Atomic Energy Division of American Machine and Foundry, Over the following five years, he supervised the construction of 20 research reactors around the world. He left in 1958 to found his own consulting firm, AVP Associates.

Early life and education
Arthur Vincent (Pete) Peterson was born in Morristown, New Jersey, on October 31, 1912, and grew up on Manhattan's East Side, where he attended Stuyvesant High School, from which he graduated in 1930. He entered New York University, from which he earned a bachelor's degree in civil engineering in 1934, and then Cornell University, from which he received a master's degree in civil engineering in 1937. He went to work as an engineer in New Jersey, but returned to Cornell in 1940, where he performed research for the Firestone Tire and Rubber Company.

Military career
A reserve officer in the United States Army, Peterson was called up to active duty in July 1941, and was joined the 36th Combat Engineer Regiment at Plattsburgh Barracks, New York, where he married Marie-Louise Darrieulat, his college sweetheart, whose father taught at Cornell. The 36th Combat Engineer Regiment subsequently moved to Fort Bragg, North Carolina.

In 1942, Peterson was assigned to the Manhattan District. He became the Chicago Area Engineer in December 1942, with the rank of major. As such, he was responsible for the activities of the Metallurgical Laboratory, which developed nuclear reactors in order to produce plutonium for atomic bombs. He briefed officers from the European Theater of Operations United States Army (ETOUSA) on possible forms an attack with radioactive poisons might take, and what the effects and symptoms of them were, and gave them instruments and shown how to use them. They were enjoined to tell other officers in the theater to report unexplained fogging of film or illnesses with symptoms corresponding to the effects of radiation sickness.

Peterson was sent to the Supreme Headquarters Allied Expeditionary Force (SHAEF), where he briefed the Supreme Allied Commander,  General  Dwight D. Eisenhower, Eisenhower's Chief of Staff, Lieutenant General Walter Bedell Smith, Assistant Chief of Staff (G-2) (Intelligence), Major General John Whiteley, and his Assistant Chief of Staff (G-3) (Operations), Major General Harold R. Bull in April 1944. As a result, they formulated a contingency plan, known as Operation Peppermint, in case the Germans used radioactive weapons.
 
In October 1944, Peterson  was given overall responsibility for the production of fissile material, with the rank of lieutenant colonel.  Plutonium bred in the Manhattan Project's reactors was used in the Fat Man atomic bomb that was dropped on Nagasaki. When the Manhattan Project was superseded by the Atomic Energy Commission (AEC) on January 1, 1947. Peterson became the  chief of its Fissionable Materials Branch, a part of the Production Division, which was located in Washington, D.C.

Later life
Peterson left the AEC in 1953 to become general manager of the new Atomic Energy Division of American Machine and Foundry, which was based in New York City. Over the following five years, he supervised the construction of 20 research reactors around the world. He left in 1958 to found his own consulting firm, AVP Associates.

Death
Peterson died of natural causes at a retirement home in Seattle on March 24, 2008. He was survived by his sons Art and John. His wife died in  2004, and his daughter Medley in 2006. He was buried at Tahoma National Cemetery.

Notes

References 
 
 
 
 
 

1912 births
2008 deaths
American civil engineers
American military engineers
United States Army personnel of World War II
Cornell University alumni
New York University alumni
People from Manhattan
People from Morristown, New Jersey
Manhattan Project people
Engineers from New Jersey
Engineers from New York (state)
20th-century American engineers
United States Army colonels
Burials at Tahoma National Cemetery
Military personnel from New Jersey